This was the first edition of the tournament. Shuko Aoyama and Ena Shibahara won the title, defeating Anna Kalinskaya and Viktória Kužmová in the final, 6–3, 6–4.

Seeds

Draw

Finals

Top half

Bottom half

References

 Main Draw

2021 WTA Tour
2021 Yarra Valley Classic – Doubles